William Charles Barber (born July 11, 1952) is a Canadian former professional ice hockey forward who played twelve seasons for the Philadelphia Flyers in the National Hockey League (NHL). As part of the famed LCB (Leach, Clarke, Barber) line, Barber helped lead the Flyers to the franchise's two Stanley Cups in 1974 and 1975.  He was inducted into the Hockey Hall of Fame in 1990.  He is currently a scouting consultant with the Flyers.

Playing career

Barber was drafted by the Flyers, seventh overall, in the first round of the 1972 draft. He was called up after 11 games in the AHL with the Richmond Robins. In his first season with the Flyers, Barber scored 30 goals and 34 assists and was a contender for the Calder Memorial Trophy for rookie of the year.

Barber was converted to left wing by coach Fred Shero. He scored at least 20 goals every season. His best season was 50 goals and 62 assists in the 1975–76 season. In the Flyers' successful 1974 and 1975 Stanley Cup playoffs campaigns, Barber contributed three and six goals respectively. Barber also contributed another six goals in an unsuccessful 1976 playoff run. In addition to his respectable scoring abilities, Barber was also a well rounded player. On the power play he was equally valuable for setting up the play as he was for pulling the trigger, and if forced into a defensive role, he was capable.

In the 1976 Canada Cup, Barber scored one of his most famous goals while playing for Team Canada. Behind in the final against Czechoslovakia, Barber scored to send the game into overtime, and an eventual Team Canada victory.

He was a team leader for the next decade. In 1979–80, the Flyers had their record 35-game unbeaten streak, and Barber was in the centre of it all. He helped the Flyers reach the Stanley Cup finals in the spring of 1980 with a number of key playoffs goals against the NY Rangers and Minnesota North Stars.

Barber captained the Flyers in the 1981–82 season and part of 1982–83. As of the end of the 2012–13 season, he still holds the Flyers regular season career scoring record with 420 goals. He is tied for the lead for Flyers career playoffs goals with Rick MacLeish; both have 53 playoffs tallies.

Barber was forced to retire as a player after the 1984–85 season after being unable to return from reconstructive knee surgery in the spring of 1984. The Flyers retired his number 7, on October 7, 1990, just after he was inducted into the Hockey Hall of Fame.

On January 14, 2017, Barber played before a sold out crowd of over 19,000 at the Wells Fargo Center in the Flyers' 50th anniversary alumni game against the alumni of the Pittsburgh Penguins, playing alongside his longtime linemates, Bobby Clarke and Reggie Leach. The game ended in a 3–3 tie. Before the game, Barber announced that it would be his last alumni game.

Coaching and executive career
After his playing career, Barber started coaching. He coached the Hershey Bears for 16 games in 1985. He was the Flyers assistant coach between 1985 and 1988. He coached the Flyers farm team, the Phantoms, for four years, winning his and the team's first Calder Cup in 1998. He was the Flyers' head coach from December 2000 until April 2002, winning the Jack Adams Trophy after 2000–01.

Barber was the director of player personnel for the Tampa Bay Lightning, a position he held from August 2002 to June 2008. Barber's name was added to the Stanley Cup for a third time in 2004 with Tampa Bay. On October 13, 2008, he returned to the Flyers organization when he was named a scouting consultant.

Personal life
Barber and his late wife, Jenny, have two children. Jenny Barber died from lung cancer in 2001.

On September 25, 2010, the Bill Barber Sports Complex was opened in his honour in his hometown, Callander, Ontario.

Career statistics

Regular season and playoffs

* Stanley Cup Champion.

International

All-Star Games

Coaching record

NHL

AHL

Awards

See also
List of NHL players with 100-point seasons
List of NHL players who spent their entire career with one franchise

References

External links

1952 births
Canadian ice hockey coaches
Canadian ice hockey left wingers
Hershey Bears coaches
Hockey Hall of Fame inductees
Ice hockey people from Ontario
Jack Adams Award winners
Kitchener Rangers players
Living people
National Hockey League All-Stars
National Hockey League first-round draft picks
National Hockey League players with retired numbers
People from Parry Sound District
Philadelphia Flyers captains
Philadelphia Flyers coaches
Philadelphia Flyers draft picks
Philadelphia Flyers players
Philadelphia Flyers scouts
Richmond Robins players
Stanley Cup champions
Tampa Bay Lightning executives